Over the Odds is a 1961 British comedy film directed by Michael Forlong and starring Marjorie Rhodes, Glenn Melvyn, Cyril Smith, Esma Cannon and Thora Hird and Wilfrid Lawson. The screenplay concerns a bookmaker who struggles to cope with his two mothers-in-law. It was based on a play by Rex Arundel.

Cast
 Marjorie Rhodes - Bridget Stone
 Glenn Melvyn - George Summers
 Cyril Smith - Sam
 Esma Cannon - Alice
 Thora Hird - Mrs Carter
 Wilfrid Lawson - Willie Summers
 Frances Cuka - Hilda Summers
 Gwen Lewis - Mrs Small
 Rex Deering - Butcher
 Patsy Rowlands - Marilyn
 Fred Griffiths - Fruit Vendor
 Leslie Crowther - Fishmonger

References

1961 films
1961 comedy films
British comedy films
Films shot at Shepperton Studios
1960s English-language films
Films directed by Michael Forlong
1960s British films